Laila Al-Marayati is a Palestinian-American doctor and a Muslim activist, and former presidential appointee to the US Commission on International Religious Freedom, where she served for two years after being appointed by President Bill Clinton.

Al-Marayati was born in 1962 and was raised in Los Angeles. Her father, the late Dr. Sabri El Farra, was originally from the Gaza Strip and her mother is from Missouri.

She earned her medical degree from UC-Irvine, and received specialty training in Obstetrics and Gynecology at Los Angeles County USC Women's Hospital. After, she opened her own practice focusing on gynecology, which she ran for 11 years. She is currently an Assistant Professor of Clinical Obstetrics and Gynecology at the University of Southern California, Keck School of Medicine. She also serves as the Director of Women's Health at the Eisner Pediatric and Family Medical Center in downtown Los Angeles.

In the 1990s, Al-Marayati served as a member of the US State Department's Advisory Committee on Religious Freedom Abroad, and was a member of the official US Delegation to the United Nations Fourth World Conference on Women in Beijing, China, alongside former-First Lady Hillary Rodham-Clinton,  in 1995.

From 1999 to 2001, she served as a presidential appointee to the US Commission on International Religious Freedom (USCIRF).

In addition, she has been the spokesperson for the Muslim Women's League, based in Los Angeles since 1994.  The MWL's main work has been to educate Muslims and non-Muslims alike about the rights of women in Islam.  She is the author of numerous articles and position papers on a range of issues that include topics such as sexuality in Islam and violence against women.  Al-Marayati led a fact-finding delegation to Croatia during the Balkan War to help spread awareness about rape survivors from Bosnia. She continues to be an outspoken critic against female genital cutting (also known as female circumcision or female genital mutilation) and other practices that are harmful to women.

She is married to Salam al-Marayati, and has three children, Malek Al-Marayati, Zayd Al-Marayati, and the youngest, Jinan Al-Marayati. She also has nieces named Khadija Abdulaziz and Fatima Abdulaziz. Her husband is the President of the Muslim Public Affairs Council whose co-founders --- Egypt-born physicians Hassan Hathout and his brother Maher - have led reform movements within the Muslim American community.  Dr. Maher Hathout is founder of the American Muslim identity, known for the reference to home:  Home is not where my grandparents are buried; home is where my grandchildren will be raised.  She is currently the chairperson of KinderUSA, which is a non-profit American organization providing humanitarian assistance to Palestinian children and their families in the West Bank, Gaza and Lebanon.

Footnotes

References
 Profile of Laila Al-Marayati, Institute for Middle East Understanding
 Biography of Laila Al-Marayati, Chautauqua Foundation
 "President Clinton names three to the US Commission on International Religious Freedom", Muslim Women's League, 6 May 1999
 "Muslim charity debate," Al Jazeera English, Aug. 25, 2009
 "A nation challenged: Influential American Muslims temper their tone", Laurie Goodstein, The New York Times, Oct. 19, 2001.
 "The Crime of Being a Muslim Charity", Laila al-Marayati and Basil Abdelkarim, Washington Post, Mar. 12, 2006.

1962 births
Living people
University of California, Irvine alumni
Keck School of Medicine of USC alumni
University of Southern California faculty
American people of Palestinian descent
Palestinian women